The Freedom Lite SS-11 Skywatch (also called the Skywatch SS11)  is a Canadian ultralight aircraft that was produced by Freedom Lite of Walton, Ontario and later by Legend Lite of New Hamburg, Ontario, introduced in 1996. When it was available the aircraft was supplied as a complete ready-to-fly-aircraft, or as a kit for amateur construction.

In Canada the SS-11 is a Transport Canada-accepted Advanced Ultra-Light Aeroplane

Design and development
Developed from the Spectrum Beaver RX650, the SS-11 Skywatch features a strut-braced high-wing, a two-seats-in-tandem enclosed cockpit accessed through upwards opening doors supported by folding struts, fixed tricycle landing gear with wheel pants, a small auxiliary tail wheel and a single engine in pusher configuration.

In improving the RX650 the company made 186 design changes to produce the SS-11. The most obvious change was the move from Dacron envelopes for the wings to doped aircraft fabric covering.

The aircraft is made from 4130 steel and aluminum tubing, plus fibreglass, with its flying surfaces covered with doped aircraft fabric. The cockpit cage is all 4130 steel, while the tail boom tube is aluminum. The wing is built with an aluminum structure, with an I-beam spar and stamped ribs. The SS-11 has folding wings and a folding tail as well, to allow ground transport or storage. Folding the wings can be accomplished by one person in a few minutes, with the struts supporting the wing.

The nose wheel is steerable, dual controls were factory standard, while the vertically-hinged cockpit doors were an option. With no occupants the aircraft sits on its tail.

The aircraft was manufactured using computer numeric-controlled matched centres. The manufacturer estimated that the supplied kit could be completed in about 250 hours of work.

Operational history
In January 2017 there were six SS-11s registered with Transport Canada, but none  registered in the United States with the Federal Aviation Administration.

Specifications (SS-11 Skywatch)

References

Skywatch SS-11
Skywatch SS-11
1990s Canadian sport aircraft
1990s Canadian ultralight aircraft
Single-engined pusher aircraft
High-wing aircraft
Homebuilt aircraft